Semljicola is a genus of sheet weavers that was first described by Embrik Strand in 1906.

Species
 it contains fourteen species, found in Asia and Europe:
Semljicola alticola (Holm, 1950) – Scandinavia, Russia (Europe, Siberia)
Semljicola angulatus (Holm, 1963) – Scandinavia, Russia (mainland, Sakhalin), Mongolia
Semljicola arcticus (Eskov, 1989) – Russia (Europe, Siberia)
Semljicola barbiger (L. Koch, 1879) (type) – Scandinavia, Russia (Europe, Siberia), Kazakhstan
Semljicola beringianus (Eskov, 1989) – Russia
Semljicola caliginosus (Falconer, 1910) – Britain (Scotland), Norway, northern Russia
Semljicola convexus (Holm, 1963) – Russia, USA (Alaska), Canada
Semljicola faustus (O. Pickard-Cambridge, 1901) – Europe, China
Semljicola lapponicus (Holm, 1939) – Scandinavia, Russia, USA (Alaska)
Semljicola latus (Holm, 1939) – Scandinavia, Russia, Mongolia
Semljicola obtusus (Emerton, 1915) – USA, Canada, Greenland
Semljicola qixiensis (Gao, Zhu & Fei, 1993) – China
Semljicola simplex (Kulczyński, 1908) – Russia (Europe, Siberia)
Semljicola thaleri (Eskov, 1981) – Russia, Kazakhstan

See also
 List of Linyphiidae species (Q–Z)

References

Araneomorphae genera
Linyphiidae
Spiders of Asia
Spiders of North America
Taxa named by Embrik Strand